Jaroslav Konečný (born 18 September 1976) is a Czech boxer. He competed in the men's lightweight event at the 1996 Summer Olympics.

References

External links
 

1976 births
Living people
Czech male boxers
Olympic boxers of the Czech Republic
Boxers at the 1996 Summer Olympics
Sportspeople from Karlovy Vary
Lightweight boxers